USA High is an American teen sitcom that ran on USA from August 1997 to June 1999, ending after 95 episodes. The series revolves around six friends enrolled at the American Academy boarding school in Paris, France.

Background Information
USA High ran for a total of 95 episodes. Season 1 consisted of 75 episodes and ran from August 4, 1997 through November 1998. Season 2 consisted of 20 episodes and aired from November 1998 until June 1999. It was rerun on USA Network through August 4, 2001.

USA High was originally conceived to be a part of NBC's Saturday morning TNBC lineup. The series' executive producer was Peter Engel, who was also responsible for the Saved by the Bell franchise, California Dreams, City Guys, and Hang Time. Its co-executive producers were Leslie Eberhard and Steve Slavkin (who was co-executive producer for the series' first 25 episodes only). The series was one of two post-Saved by the Bell: The College Years series executive produced by Engel that did not air as part of the TNBC lineup, Malibu, CA being the other.

Cast
 Josh Holland as Jackson Greene
 Elena Lyons as Lauren Fontaine
 Thomas Magiar as Christian Mueller
 Marquita Terry as Winnie Barnes
 James Madio as Bobby Lazzarini (season 1)
 Kristen Miller as Ashley Elliot
 Angela Visser as Miss Gabrielle Dupree
 Nicholas Guest as Headmaster Patrick Elliot
 William James Jones as Dwane "Excess" Wilson (season 2)

Episodes

References

External links

1997 American television series debuts
1999 American television series endings
1990s American high school television series
1990s American teen sitcoms
English-language television shows
Television series about teenagers
Television shows set in Paris
NBC original programming